Pluteus is a large genus of fungi. It may also refer to:

 Pluteus (sculpture), a balustrade made up of massive rectangular slabs which divides part of a building in half
 Pluteus larva, the larval stage of echinoderms
 Pluteo 29.1, also known as Pluteus 29.1, an illuminated manuscript

See also
 Plutus (disambiguation)